Domaine Jacques Prieur is a wine grower-producer in Burgundy, France, located in Meursault. The domaine produces wines from both Côte de Beaune and Côte de Nuits.

Its Montrachet competed in the Grand European Jury Wine Tasting of 1997.

See also
French wine
Burgundy wine

References

External links
Official website

Burgundy (historical region) wine producers